Miletus melanion is a butterfly in the family Lycaenidae. It is found on the Philippines.

Subspecies
 Miletus melanion melanion (Philippines)
 Miletus melanion euphranor (Fruhstorfer, 1914) (Philippines: Mindoro)

References

Butterflies described in 1865
Miletus (butterfly)
Butterflies of Asia
Taxa named by Baron Cajetan von Felder
Taxa named by Rudolf Felder